Wittmackia sulbahianensis is a species of plant in the family Bromeliaceae. This species is endemic to eastern Brazil, known from the States of Bahia and Espírito Santo.

References

sulbahianensis
Endemic flora of Brazil
Plants described in 2007